Cystiscus marshalli is a species of very small sea snail, a marine gastropod mollusk or micromollusk in the family Cystiscidae.

Description

Distribution
This marine species occurs off New Caledonia.

References

Cystiscidae
Gastropods described in 2003
Marshalli